Thunder Run is a 1986 American action-thriller film directed by Gary Hudson and starring Forrest Tucker and John Ireland.  It was developed by special-effects expert Clifford Wenger Sr. and his wife, Carol Lynn. It was dedicated to their son, Clifford Wenger Jr., who also worked on the movie on special effects, while simultaneously working on Rambo: First Blood Part II, where he was killed in an explosion accident in 1984. During the 1980s the movie was frequently aired on cable channels such as Showtime and The Movie Channel where it developed a cult following. The film is notable for an action sequence in which an 18-wheeler jumps over a train.

Plot
A Korean War veteran/aging trucker spends his retirement mining an old cobalt mine with the assistance of his devoted grandson. A good friend lures the trucker out of retirement by offering him a quarter of a million dollars to drive some plutonium from Nevada to a high-security operation in Arizona. He begins his trek in a high-tech rig unaware that domestic terrorists are waiting to ambush him and his deadly cargo.

Cast
 Forrest Tucker as Charlie Morrison
 John Ireland as George Adams
 John Shepherd as Chris
 Jill Whitlow as Kim
 Wallace Langham as Paul
 Graham Ludlow as Mike
 Alan Rachins as Carlos

References

External links
 
 
 

1986 films
1986 action films
Films set in Arizona
Films shot in Nevada
American independent films
Golan-Globus films
1986 independent films
Trucker films
1980s English-language films
1980s American films